This is a list of the Mayors of Bolton in the north west of England. The office of Mayor is a ceremonial, non-political post. As the Borough's First Citizen, the Mayor serves as the civic representative at a wide range of functions and events throughout the local authority.

The Mayors of Bolton have represented three types of local government districts. The Mayors of the Municipal Borough of Bolton 1838–1889, the Mayors of the County Borough of Bolton 1889–1974, and the present Mayors of the Metropolitan Borough of Bolton since 1974.

There was also a Transitional Mayor / Chairman in 1973–1974 who saw over the dissolution of the County Borough of Bolton and the foundation of the Metropolitan Borough of Bolton.

Mayors of Bolton

Municipal borough mayors

County borough mayors

Transitional mayor

Metropolitan borough mayors

References

External links 
 Mayor - general information. Bolton Council.
 Links in a Chain. Covering the Mayors of Bolton, along with the Chairmen and Mayors of Farnworth, Kearsley, Little Lever, Horwich, Westhoughton, Turton, and Blackrod.

 
Metropolitan Borough of Bolton
Mayors of Bolton
Lists of mayors of places in England
Mayors of Bolton
Mayors
Mayors